Stepan Pavlovich Kostyukov (born 11 January 1999) is a Russian football player. He plays for FC Chernomorets Novorossiysk.

Club career
He made his debut in the Russian Football National League for FC Metallurg Lipetsk on 21 August 2021 in a game against FC Krasnodar-2.

References

External links
 
 
 Profile by Russian Football National League

1999 births
Footballers from Moscow
Living people
Russian footballers
Association football forwards
FC Tosno players
FC Strogino Moscow players
FC Metallurg Lipetsk players
FC Torpedo Vladimir players
FC Chernomorets Novorossiysk players
Russian Second League players
Russian First League players